106 Squadron or 106th Squadron may refer to:

 106 Squadron (Israel)
 106 Squadron SAAF, South Africa
 No. 106 Squadron IAF, India
 No. 106 Squadron RAF, United Kingdom
 106th Air Refueling Squadron, United States Air Force
 VFA-106, United States Navy
 VP-106, United States Navy